Zsombor Takács (born 22 February 1999) is a Hungarian football player who plays for Pécsi MFC.

Career

Ferencváros
On 6 April 2019, Takács played his first match for Ferencváros in a 3-0 win against Paksi FC in the Hungarian League.

Club statistics

Updated to games played as of 6 April 2019.

References

External links

1999 births
Living people
Footballers from Budapest
Hungarian footballers
Hungary youth international footballers
Association football defenders
Ferencvárosi TC footballers
Soroksár SC players
Budapesti VSC footballers
Nemzeti Bajnokság I players
Nemzeti Bajnokság II players
Nemzeti Bajnokság III players
21st-century Hungarian people